Buño is a small town near Malpica de Bergantiños and Ponteceso in Spain. It belongs to the comarca of Bergantiños.

The town is known for its pottery.

External links
http://www.finisterrae.com/oleria/

Towns in Spain